Drásov is a market town in Brno-Country District in the South Moravian Region of the Czech Republic. It has about 2,000 inhabitants.

Notable people
Vladimír Šmeral (1903–1982), actor
Michal Hašek (born 1976), politician; former mayor of Drásov

References

Populated places in Brno-Country District
Market towns in the Czech Republic